Andrea Varraux (born February 7, 1986 in Orlando, Florida) is an American pair skater. With David Pelletier, Varraux won the 2003 Junior Grand Prix event in Croatia and placed fourth in Ostrava. They went on to place seventh at the Junior Grand Prix Final. Pelletier and Varraux are the 2004 US National junior bronze medalists and placed eighth at the World Junior Figure Skating Championships that year. Varraux also competed on the senior level as a singles skater.

Personal life

DATE OF BIRTH     = February 7

Results

Ladies' singles

Pairs
(with Pelletier)

External links
 
 Pairs on Ice profile
 Unseen Skaters Profile

American female pair skaters
1986 births
Living people
21st-century American women
20th-century American women